Gundinci is a municipality in Brod-Posavina County, Croatia. There are 2,294 inhabitants in which 99% declare themselves Croats. (2001 census)

The people live 1 naselja:

 Gundinci

References

 

Municipalities of Croatia
Populated places in Brod-Posavina County